Johnny Haines  (born 19 July 1964) is an English professional darts player who currently played in the World Darts Federation (WDF) events. His nickname is "The Punk" and he qualified for the PDC Pro Tour via Q School in 2012 and 2015.

Career
Haines made his television debut at the 2009 UK Open at the Reebok Stadium in Bolton qualifying as an amateur. He lost 7–9 to Mark Dudbridge in the last 64 earning himself £1,000 in the process.

Haines' best result of 2012 was getting to the quarter-finals of the Dutch Darts Masters in Nuland by defeating Peter Wright, Raymond van Barneveld and Jamie Caven along the way before losing 2–6 in the quarter-final to Simon Whitlock.

Haines qualified for the World Championship by finishing 41st on the 2012 ProTour Order of Merit, claiming the 10th of 16 spots that were awarded to non-qualified players. In his first appearance at the World Championship he lost to world number six Wes Newton 0–3 in the first round after missing a series of crucial doubles. Haines was ranked world number 65 after the tournament. The deepest run in a tournament Haines could achieve in 2013 came in the second UK Open Qualifier where he lost 6–1 in the last 16 versus Peter Wright. This result saw him qualify for the UK Open and Haines beat Nigel Daniels 5–1, but lost 5–2 to William O'Connor in the second round. Haines could only reach the last 32 of one tournament during the rest of the year. 

Haines just hung on to his position on the tour by starting 2014 64th on the Order of Merit, claiming the final automatic place available. At the UK Open he lost 5–4 to Nigel Heydon in the second round. At the seventh Players Championship he advanced to the last 16 for the first time in over a year by winning three games which included a 6–2 victory over Raymond van Barneveld, but he lost 6–3 to Ben Ward. Haines hit a nine-dart finish at the 10th event during a win over Jelle Klaasen to reach the last 16 once more, where he was beaten 6–4 by Dean Winstanley. Haines beat Denis Ovens and Peter Wright both 6–4 in the opening rounds of the Gibraltar Darts Trophy and was 4–1 ahead of Steve Beaton in the third round but missed multiple match darts to be defeated 6–5. He missed out on qualifying for the 2015 World Championship by just £500 on the Pro Tour Order of Merit.

Haines dropped to world number 76 in January 2015 meaning he needed to enter Q School to win his place back on the PDC tour. He reached the last 16 once during the four days of play and went on to finish inside the top 18 on the Order of Merit to earn a fresh two-year tour card. A last 16 defeat in the first qualifier saw Haines play in the UK Open, but he lost 5–4 to James Richardson in the first round. He recorded two last 16 finishes in Players Championship events during the year. Haines eliminated Christian Soethe 6–4 and Benito van de Pas 6–3 at the European Darts Open, but lost 6–1 to Michael van Gerwen in the third round. The £2,000 he earned was his biggest cheque of 2015.

A disappointing 2016 saw Haines reach the last 64 of six events and losing at this stage every time. He was knocked out 6–5 by Gary Stone in the first round of the UK Open.

Haines joining of the WDF in October 2021. In December 2021, Haines qualified for the 2022 WDF World Championships via a qualifier which was played at Lakeside, he beat Scott Walters 6-5 to secure his place. Haines reached the Last 32 of the event. Beating John Scott in the Last 48 2-0. Before going down 3-2 in a very tight contest against Number 1 Seed Brian Raman 3-2 in the Sudden death final leg.

World Championship results

PDC
 2013: First round (lost to Wes Newton 0–3) (sets)

WDF
 2022: Second round (lost to Brian Raman 2–3)

References

External links 
 

1964 births
Living people
English darts players
Professional Darts Corporation former tour card holders
People from Swindon